St Chad's Church occupies a prominent position in Shrewsbury, the county town of Shropshire. The current church building was built in 1792, and with its distinctive round shape and high tower it is a well-known landmark in the town. It faces The Quarry area of parkland, which slopes down to the River Severn. The church is a Grade I listed building.

The motto of the church is "open doors, open hearts, and open minds". This indicates the aspiration of the church to be a welcoming church, involved in the community, and on a collective journey seeking after God.

Charles Darwin was baptised in St Chad's church in 1809, and as a young boy attended the church with his mother Susannah.

In 2010, the church became a member of the Greater Churches Group.

History

The present building replaced an earlier church, dedicated to St Chad, situated near College Hill; this was a 13th-century building which was largely destroyed when the central tower collapsed in 1788. All that remains of the earlier building is a side chapel surrounded by a disused churchyard which also contains an exposed crypt.

Scottish architect George Steuart was commissioned to build a new church. He submitted four design proposals, three of which followed a circular plan. Round or oval churches were briefly in vogue during the latter decades of the 18th century, due to the influence of French neo-classicism. Steuart "strenuously recommended" one of his round designs in particular, but the local planning committee insisted on an oblong church.

This having been decided, the committee's next task was to find a site for the new church, and Steuart was asked to provide a sketch of his design to help fix the location. He provided a sketch of a round church, a fact which went unnoticed or unmentioned by the committee. After a site had been chosen in the Quarry, Steuart submitted his working drawings, which also exhibited a round design. When the committee objected, he told them that he had assumed from their silence that they approved of the plan, and that he required to be paid for the work done before he would submit a new set of drawings. By this time, the planning process had been so hampered by argument and delay that the committee thought it preferable to simply go ahead with the round design.

The foundation stone was laid on St Chad's day, 2 March 1790. The church was built of white Grinshill stone. The building work was supervised by John Simpson (who later worked on several projects with Thomas Telford, including the Pontcysyllte Aqueduct). Internally, the gallery was supported by slender cast iron pillars, an early example of cast iron used for this purpose; they were made by William Hazledine, a pioneering ironmaster who had a foundry in Shrewsbury. (There are memorials to Simpson and Hazledine on either side of the sanctuary arch of the church.)

The church was opened on 19 August 1792.

The sanctuary window is a copy in stained glass of a triptych by Rubens in Antwerp Cathedral; it was made in the 1840s by David Evans, a local stained glass artist. The original pulpit, which obscured the altar, was removed in 1888; it was replaced by a copper and brass pulpit in Arts and Crafts style, placed to one side and giving a clearer view of the Sanctuary.

The entrance hall has many memorials relating to the 53rd Regiment of Foot, and its successor regiment the King's Shropshire Light Infantry (KSLI) including:

alabaster tablet memorial to officers and men of the 53rd who died at the Battle of Sobraon (1846);
large tablet to those of that regiment who died in the Indian Mutiny campaign (1857–59);
tablet to those of the 1st Battalion KSLI who died in the Egyptian campaign of 1882;
tablet to those of the 1st KSLI who died in the occupation of Suakim, Sudan, 1885–86;
tablet above vestibule entrance to KSLI dead (4,700 all ranks) of the First World War, unveiled 1930 in presence of Poet Laureate John Masefield; and
books of remembrance of KSLI war dead of both World Wars, in separate cases, in addition to separate county books of remembrance to all war dead from the county of Shropshire.

In 1913, a vestry off the right hand side of the entrance lobby was converted to a chapel of St Aidan, in memory of former vicar Richard Eden St Aubyn Arkwright. In 1951, at about the same time as a second storey was added to another vestry on the opposite side of the lobby, funds were raised to convert this chapel into a regimental chapel for the KSLI, resulting in an enlarged apse, new altar, rood screen, rails and chairs. In 1952 and 1966, Regimental colours were laid up here.

After the First World War, the church's main sanctuary was refitted with a light oak reredos, designed by Cecil Lightwood Hare, new altar and wainscot as a memorial to the parish fallen of the war, repainted in gold leaf and cobalt in 1951.

Churchyard
Still present in the now-disused churchyard is the headstone prop of Ebenezer Scrooge (played by George C. Scott) that was used in the 1984 film A Christmas Carol for the scene where Scrooge finds his own grave. According to the Shrewsbury Town Crier, Martin Wood, the headstone is not a "prop" but an actual period headstone, on which the original inscription had deteriorated to the point that the movie production people asked the church if they could use it and inscribe the "Ebenezer Scrooge" words on it. Some of the original inscription can still be seen on the bottom part of the stone. Among those actually buried in the churchyard was Shrewsbury architect Edward Haycock, Sr.

Music
Music is a strong tradition at St Chad's. The church has a robed choir which leads the music at many of the services. The church organ is a large three-manual pipe organ, built by Norman and Beard in 1904 and restored by Nicholson & Co Ltd in 1963 and Harrison & Harrison in 1985 and more recently in 2011. The church hosts lunchtime organ recitals and other concerts.

Notable clergy
Sir Lovelace Stamer, 3rd Baronet, Vicar 1892–96, also Anglican Bishop of Shrewsbury 1888–1906
Charles Bulmer Maude, Vicar 1896–1906, also Archdeacon of Salop 1896–1917
William Alonzo Parker, Vicar 1942–45, later Anglican Bishop of Shrewsbury 1959–70
William Johnston, Vicar, later Bishop of Dunwich 1977–80
Robert Willis, Curate 1972–75, later Dean of Canterbury

See also
Grade I listed churches in Shropshire
Listed buildings in Shrewsbury (northwest central area)

References

External links
St Chad's Church web site

Church of England church buildings in Shropshire
Grade I listed churches in Shropshire
Round churches in England
Georgian architecture in England
Neoclassical architecture in Shropshire
Diocese of Lichfield
Chad
Neoclassical church buildings in England